The 1981 Maui Pro Tennis Classic, also known as the Hawaii Open, was a men's tennis tournament played an outdoor hard courts in Maui, Hawaii, in the United States that was part of the 1981 Volvo Grand Prix circuit. It was the eighth edition of the tournament and was held from September 29 through October 4, 1981. Unseeded Hank Pfister won the singles title.

Finals

Singles
 Hank Pfister defeated  Tim Mayotte 6–4, 6–4
 It was Pfister's first singles title of his career.

Doubles
 Matt Mitchell /  Tony Graham defeated  John Alexander /  James Delaney 6–3, 3–6, 7–6

References

Maui Pro Tennis Classic
Maui Pro Tennis Classic
Maui Pro Tennis Classic
Maui Pro Tennis Classic
Maui Pro Tennis Classic
Hawaii Open